Bloody Run is a tributary of West Branch Fishing Creek in Sullivan County, Pennsylvania, in the United States. Various glacial tills and bedrock consisting of sandstone and shale are found in the vicinity of the stream. The stream is designated for use by aquatic life and is a High-Quality Coldwater Fishery.

Course
Bloody Run begins in a valley on a plateau in Davidson Township. It flows south-southeast for a short distance before turning south-southwest. The stream then turns east-southeast for a few tenths of a mile and its valley deepens. It turns south-southeast and then south for approximately two miles (three kilometers) and its valley continues to deepen. The stream then leaves its valley and turns east-southeast for a few tenths of a mile, in the valley of West Branch Fishing Creek. It then reaches its confluence with West Branch Fishing Creek.

Geography and geology

There are riffles on Bloody run.

A glacial till known as the Wisconsinan Bouldery Till can be found in the lower reaches of Bloody Run and in its valley. The stream's upper reaches are in the vicinity of a glacial till known as the Wisconsinan Till. In the stream's middle reaches and on the edges of its valley, there is bedrock consisting of shale and sandstone.

Watershed
The stream is entirely within the United States Geological Survey quadrangle of Elk Grove.

Bloody Run is in the headwaters of the Fishing Creek watershed. A minor road crosses the stream.

Bloody Run is designated by the Pennsylvania Department of Environmental Protection for use by aquatic life. It attains the Pennsylvania Department of Environmental Protection's standards for this use.

History and etymology
Bloody Run was entered into the Geographic Names Information System on August 2, 1979. Its identifier in the Geographic Names Information System is 1169835.

According to legend, John "Hunter John" McHenry killed seven deer near Bloody Run in a single day in the late 1700s. The stream is named as a tribute to McHenry.

Biology
Bloody Run is designated as a High-Quality Coldwater Fishery. Larvae of the species Palaeagapetus celsus have been observed in the vicinity of the stream.

See also
Elk Run (West Branch Fishing Creek), next tributary of West Branch Fishing Creek going downstream
Painter Run, next tributary of West Branch Fishing Creek going upstream
List of tributaries of Fishing Creek (North Branch Susquehanna River)

References

Rivers of Sullivan County, Pennsylvania
Tributaries of Fishing Creek (North Branch Susquehanna River)
Rivers of Pennsylvania